Efthymios Kalaras is a paralympic athlete from Greece competing mainly in category F54 discus throw events.

Efthymios twice competed in the discus at the Paralympics, the first time in the 2004 Summer Paralympics led to a silver medal.  He could not match this performance in the 2008 Summer Paralympics where he finished fifth.

References

Paralympic athletes of Greece
Athletes (track and field) at the 2004 Summer Paralympics
Athletes (track and field) at the 2008 Summer Paralympics
Paralympic silver medalists for Greece
Living people
Medalists at the 2004 Summer Paralympics
Year of birth missing (living people)
Place of birth missing (living people)
Paralympic medalists in athletics (track and field)
Greek male discus throwers
21st-century Greek people